Walker is an American action crime drama television series developed by Anna Fricke for The CW. It is a reboot of the 1990s western drama television series Walker, Texas Ranger. The series was ordered straight to series in 2020, with Jared Padalecki playing the titular role. It premiered on January 21, 2021.

In February 2021, the series was renewed for a second season which premiered on October 28, 2021. In March 2022, the series was renewed for a third season which premiered on October 6, 2022.

Cast and characters

Main
 Jared Padalecki as Cordell Walker, a legendary Texas Ranger who just returned home after a lengthy undercover assignment
 Mason Thames as Young Walker (season 2)
 Colin Ford as Corporal Cordell Walker (season 3)
 Lindsey Morgan as Micki Ramirez (seasons 1–2), Cordell's new partner in the Texas Rangers
 Molly Hagan as Abeline Walker, Cordell and Liam's mother
 Keegan Allen as Liam Walker, Cordell's brother and an assistant DA for the City of Austin
 Violet Brinson as Stella Walker, Cordell's 16-year-old daughter
 Kale Culley as August "Auggie" Walker, Cordell's 14-year-old son
 Coby Bell as Larry James, Cordell's former partner turned captain
 Jeff Pierre as Trey Barnett, Micki's army medic boyfriend
 Mitch Pileggi as Bonham Walker, Cordell and Liam's father
 Odette Annable as Geraldine "Geri" Broussard (season 2–present; recurring season 1), an old friend of Walker and Emily who runs a bar
 Ashley Reyes as Cassie Perez (season 2–present), a Texas Ranger from Dallas who becomes Walker's new partner

Recurring
 Genevieve Padalecki as Emily Walker (season 1; guest season 2–3), Cordell's late wife and Stella and August's late mother
 Matt Barr as Hoyt Rawlins (season 1), Cordell's best friend and Geri's long time on and off boyfriend
 Alex Landi as Bret Nam (season 1; guest season 2), Liam's ex-fiancé
 Gabriela Flores as Isabel "Bel" Muñoz (season 1), Stella's best friend from a family of undocumented immigrant
 Jeffrey Nordling as Stan Morrison (season 1; guest season 2) the corrupt head of the Texas DPS who killed Emily
 Madelyn Kientz as Ruby (season 1), August's friend
 Mandy McMillian as Connie Richards (season 1), receptionist and hacker for Texas DPS
 Gavin Casalegno as Trevor Strand (season 1), Clint's son who befriends Stella
 Austin Nichols as Clint West (season 1), The former ring leader of the Rodeo Kings operation and a convicted felon
 Joe Perez as Carlos Mendoza (season 1), the falsely convicted murderer of Emily Walker
 Alex Meneses as Dr. Adriana Ramirez (season 1), Micki's aunt who is a psychiatrist
 Cameron Vitosh as Todd, Stella and August's friend
 Paula Marshall as Gale Davidson (season 2), Denise's mother and rival of Abeline
 Amara Zaragoza as Denise Davidson (season 2), the new district attorney and Gale's daughter who has a history with Cordell
 Dave Annable as Dan Miller (seasons 2–3), Denise's loving husband
 Jalen Thomas Brooks as Colton Davidson (seasons 2–3), Denise and Dan's son
 Bella Samman as Faye (season 2), Stella's friend
 Matt Pascua as Ben Perez (seasons 2–3), Cassie's older brother
 Anna Enger Ritch as Julia Johnson (season 3), a reporter held in captivity with Cordell
 David B. Meadows as Sergeant Clay Cooper (season 3), Cordell's commanding officer in the army
 Jake Abel as Kevin Golden (season 3), Cassie's love interest

Guest
 Chris Labadie as Jordan (season 1), an ex-con employed by a shady business
 Karina Dominguez as Alma Muñoz (season 1), Bel's mother who is an undocumented immigrant
 Ricky Catter as Lorenzo Muñoz (season 1), Bel's father who is an undocumented immigrant
 Andre Williams as Ranger Randall (Season 1, Season 2) good friend of Cordell
 Andre Martin as Coach Bobby (season 1), Stella and Isabel's soccer coach
 Rebekah Graf as Crystal (season 1), Clint's wife
 Karissa Lee Staples as Twyla Jean, a member of the Rodeo Kings and Cordell's girlfriend when he was undercover
 Matthew Barnes as Garrison (season 2), Micki's childhood ex-fiancé and Serano's right-hand
 Henderson Wade as Serano (season 2), a powerful drug lord
 Felix Alonzo as Marv Davidson (season 2), Gale's deceased husband and Denise and Geri's father
 Mustafa Elzein as Miles Vyas (season 2), Cassie's presumed deceased former partner
 Jensen Ackles as Miles Vyas (cameo season 2 episode 14)

Episodes

Season 1 (2021)

Season 2 (2021–22)

Season 3 (2022–23)

Production

Development
In September 2019, it was announced that a reboot of Walker, Texas Ranger starring Jared Padalecki was in development. The CW picked up the project for its 2020–2021 development slate in October 2019. In January 2020, it was announced that The CW had ordered the project directly to series, bypassing a television pilot, and would be titled Walker. The series is written by Anna Fricke who is also expected to executive produce alongside Dan Lin, Lindsey Liberatore and Padalecki. Production companies involved with the series were slated to consist of CBS Television Studios and Rideback. On February 3, 2021, The CW gave the series an additional five episodes bringing the total episodes for the first season to 18 episodes and renewed the series for a second season. The second season premiered on October 28, 2021. On March 22, 2022, The CW renewed the series for a third season.

Casting
On February 5, 2020, it was announced that Lindsey Morgan had joined Walker in the role of Micki, Walker's new partner in the Texas Rangers. The same month, Keegan Allen was cast in the role of Walker's brother, Liam, while Mitch Pileggi and Molly Hagan were cast as Walker's father and mother, Bonham and Abeline, respectively. On February 28, 2020, it was announced that Coby Bell had joined the series, playing the role of Texas Ranger Captain Larry James. On March 4, 2020, Jeff Pierre was cast as a series regular. On March 12, 2020, Violet Brinson and Kale Culley joined the cast as series regulars. On September 14, 2020, Genevieve Padalecki, Jared Padalecki's wife, was cast in a recurring role. On October 30, 2020, Odette Annable was cast in a recurring role. In November 2020, Chris Labadie and Alex Landi joined the cast in recurring roles. On December 4, 2020, Gabriela Flores was cast in a recurring role. On January 7, 2021, Rebekah Graf joined the cast in a recurring capacity. On February 19, 2021, Alex Meneses was cast in a recurring role. On April 29, 2021, it was reported that Odette Annable was promoted as a series regular for the second season. On August 31, 2021, it was announced that Dave Annable joined the cast in a recurring role for the second season.
On October 22, 2021, it was announced that Mason Thames will have a recurring role as Young Walker. Jalen Thomas Brooks was also cast as Colton Davidson.

Filming
During a meeting on October 15, 2020, the Austin City Council approved an agreement for $141,326 in incentives that would allow the reboot, Walker, to start filming in Austin. The Texas Film Commission is planning to offer an incentive of $9.3 million.

Release

Marketing
On December 14, 2020, The CW released the first official trailer for the series.

Broadcast
Walker premiered on January 21, 2021, as part of The CW's 2020–21 television season. In Canada, the series airs on the CTV Drama Channel, simulcast with The CW in the United States. The second season premiered on October 6, 2022.

Home media

Prequel series

In December 2021, it was reported that a prequel series titled, Walker: Independence, was in development at The CW with Padalecki as executive producer and Fricke as showrunner. A pilot order was confirmed in February 2022. Larry Teng would direct the pilot, Justin Johnson Cortez was cast as a series regular, and Barr was also cast as Hoyt Rawlins. In March 2022, it was announced that Katherine McNamara had been cast in the lead role. She will be portraying Abby Walker, the ancestor of Padalecki's Cordell Walker. Also that month, Lawrence Kao, Greg Hovanessian, Philemon Chambers and Katie Findlay joined the cast as series regulars. In May 2022, The CW picked up the series for a fall premiere and paired it with its parent series in a Thursday time slot. In June 2022, Gabriela Quezada was cast as a series regular. The series premiered on October 6, 2022.

Reception

Critical response
On the review aggregator website Rotten Tomatoes, the first season has an approval rating of 33% based on 18 critic reviews, with an average rating of 4.93/10. The website's critic consensus states, "Despite decent performances, Walker bland storytelling and limited action fails to fill its namesake's butt-kicking boots." On Metacritic, it has a weighted average score of 51 out of 100 based on 8 critic reviews, indicating "mixed or average reviews".

Ratings
The Walker pilot marked The CW's most-watched telecast since January 30, 2018, and its most-watched season premiere since The Flash (season 4) in October 2017. The premiere also garnered the highest viewership for any episode in its time slot in four years, since the airing of the "Invasion!" episode of the show Legends of Tomorrow. It also attracted the largest Live+7-day viewership for a new series since 2016's Legends of Tomorrow.

Overall

Season 1

Season 2

Season 3

References

External links
 

2020s American crime drama television series
2020s American LGBT-related drama television series
2021 American television series debuts
American action television series
The CW original programming
Gay-related television shows
Television productions postponed due to the COVID-19 pandemic
Television series about the Texas Ranger Division
Television series about families
Television series by CBS Studios
Television series reboots
Television shows set in Austin, Texas
Television shows filmed in Texas
Neo-Western television series
2020s Western (genre) television series